Bastard  or The Song of the Wilderness (Swedish: Vildmarkens sång) is a 1940 Norwegian-Swedish drama film directed by Helge Lunde and Gösta Stevens and starring Georg Løkkeberg, Signe Hasso and Alfred Maurstad. The story is based on the story "Basterd" by F. W. Remmler.

Cast
 Georg Løkkeberg as Burtaj
 Signe Hasso as 	Aitanga, nomadepike
 Alfred Maurstad as Wasilj, bondegutt
 Gabriel Alw as Amgan
 Hilda Borgström as 	Taina
 Georg Blickingberg as 	Jarlule
 Sven Bergvall as 	En orotsjonhøvding	
 Emil Fjellström as 	Prison Guard
 Kristian Hefte as Russer
 Joachim Holst-Jensen as 	En fangevokter
 Karl Holter as Iwan
 Holger Löwenadler as County Sheriff
 Gunnar Olram as En orotsjon
 Bjørg Riiser-Larsen as Orotsjohøvdingens datter
 Guri Stormoen as Russisk pike
 Einar Vaage as En orotsjon

References

Bibliography 
 Qvist, Per Olov & von Bagh, Peter. Guide to the Cinema of Sweden and Finland. Greenwood Publishing Group, 2000.

External links
 
 

1940 films
1940 drama films
Norwegian black-and-white films
Swedish black-and-white films
Films based on short fiction
1940s Norwegian-language films
Swedish drama films
Films directed by Gösta Stevens
Norwegian drama films
1940s Swedish films